Kiril Gechevski (born 19 May 1954) is a Bulgarian sports shooter. He competed in the mixed skeet event at the 1980 Summer Olympics.

References

1954 births
Living people
Bulgarian male sport shooters
Olympic shooters of Bulgaria
Shooters at the 1980 Summer Olympics
Place of birth missing (living people)
20th-century Bulgarian people